The Twelve Provinces is a term used in ancient Chinese histories to refer to territorial divisions during the reigns of the mythological emperors Yao and Shun of the Three Sovereigns and Five Emperors.

Records in histories
The "Annals of the Five Emperors" (五帝本紀) section of Records of the Grand Historian mentioned:

Shun felt that the land north of Ji Province was too wide, so he created Bing Province; Yan and Qi were too vast and distant, so he formed You Province out of Yan, and Ying Province out of Qi, hence there were the Twelve Provinces.

Volume 85 of the Book of Han recorded that in 30 BC Gu Yong (谷永) mentioned:

There was a great flood in Yao's time, the land was divided into the Twelve Provinces...

Yan Shigu of the Tang dynasty wrote this annotation in volume 85 of the Book of Han:

The Twelve Provinces were Ji, Yan, Yu, Qing, Xu, Jing, Yang, Yong, Liang, You, Bing, and Ying (營).

See also 

 Nine Provinces
 Eighteen Provinces

References

External links

Chinese words and phrases
Provinces of Ancient China